George Parry (12 December 1908 – 26 October 1979) was a South African cricket umpire. He stood in two Test matches in 1962.

See also
 List of Test cricket umpires

References

1908 births
1979 deaths
Place of birth missing
South African Test cricket umpires